Tim Widing (born 14 July 1997) is a Swedish professional golfer and Korn Ferry Tour player. As an amateur, he won two silver medals at European Team Championships and one silver at the Junior Golf World Cup in Japan.

Amateur career
Widing grew up in Jönköping, where he played for the A6 Golf Club since he was 13 years old. He had success as a junior and won several titles on the Teen Tour and in the Junior Masters Invitational series.

He appeared for the National Team at the 2015 Junior Golf World Cup in Japan where his team secured the silver, behind the host nation. He also won silver with the team at the European Boys' Team Championship in 2015 behind Italy, and again in 2016, this time behind Germany. He was a member of the Continental European Team in the Jacques Léglise Trophy contested against Great Britain and Ireland.

Widing accepted a scholarship to University of San Francisco and played with the San Francisco Dons golf team 2016–2021. He won three individual titles, and became only the second male student-athlete in USF history to earn first-team all-conference honors four times. As a senior, he was named All-American and crowned USF Male Athlete of the Year. He graduated with a degree in International business, and due to Q-School cancellation because of COVID, stayed on a fifth year to do a graduate degree in sports management.

Widing lost a playoff to Angus Flanagan in the Collegiate Showcase at the 2021 Genesis Invitational to lose out on a spot in field and his first PGA Tour start, but was later offered a sponsor's exemption after Andy Ogletree withdrew due to injury.

Professional career
Widing turned professional in June 2021 and made seven starts on the European Challenge Tour over the summer. In his fourth start, he led the Euram Bank Open ahead the final round, but a bout of food poisoning following a bad pasta carbonara forced him to drop out of the tournament. A few weeks later, he also led the Made in Esbjerg Challenge after a five-under-par opening round of 66.

Widing  joined the 2022 PGA Tour Latinoamérica after he finished second at the Q-School at Estrella del Mar in Mexico. His best finish was a tie for fifth at the Abierto del Centro, and he finished 33rd in the rankings to keep his status. In February, he won the Storyi Temecula Open on the Golden State Tour, and in December he finished solo third at the Argentina Classic.

Widing joined the 2023 Korn Ferry Tour after he finished tied 29th in the Final Stage of Q-School at the Landings Club in Savannah, Georgia.

Amateur wins
2012 Skandia Tour Regional #3 - Halland
2013 Öijared Junior Open
2015 Skandia Tour Elit #5, Junior Masters Invitational, Skydda Junior Open
2016 Wilson Junior Open
2018 Seattle U Redhawk Invite
2020 Lamkin Grips SD Classic
2021 Ping Cougar Classic 

Source:

Professional wins (2)

Other wins (2)
2019 Wiredaholm Open (SGF Golf Ranking, as an amateur)
2022 Storyi Temecula Open (Golden State Tour)

Team appearances
Amateur
European Young Masters (representing Sweden): 2013
European Boys' Team Championship (representing Sweden): 2014, 2015
Junior Golf World Cup (representing Sweden): 2015
Jacques Léglise Trophy (representing Continental Europe): 2015
Eisenhower Trophy (representing Sweden): 2018
European Amateur Team Championship (representing Sweden): 2017, 2018

Source:

References

External links

Swedish male golfers
San Francisco Dons men's golfers
Sportspeople from Jönköping
People from Huskvarna
1997 births
Living people